Ahmadabad or Ahmedabad may refer to:

India
 Ahmedabad, or Amdavad, a city in Gujarat
 Ahmedabad district

Pakistan
 Ahmedabad, Punjab, a city in Punjab
 Ahmedabad, Gilgit Baltistan, a village in Gilgit-Baltistan
 Fort Ahmadabad, or Kot Diji Fort, a fort in Sindh

Afghanistan
 Ahmad Aba District (or Ahmadabad), Paktia Province, Afghanistan

Azerbaijan
Əhmədabad, Goranboy, Azerbaijan
Əhmədabad, Sabirabad, Azerbaijan
Əhmədabad, Tovuz, Azerbaijan

Iran

Alborz Province
Ahmadabad-e Etemad ol Dowleh, a village in Savojbolagh County
Ahmadabad-e Mosaddeq, a village in Nazarabad County
Ahmadabad Rural District (Nazarabad County), an administrative subdivision of Nazarabad County

Ardabil Province
Ahmadabad, Khalkhal, a village in Khalkhal County
Ahmadabad, Kowsar, a village in Kowsar County
Ahmadabad, Meshgin Shahr, a village in Meshgin Shahr County

Bushehr Province
Ahmadabad, Deyr, a village in Deyr County
Ahmadabad, Jam, a village in Jam County
Ahmadabad, Tangestan, a village in Tangestan County

Chaharmahal and Bakhtiari Province
 Ahmadabad, Chaharmahal and Bakhtiari, a village in Lordegan County

East Azerbaijan Province
 Ahmadabad, Bostanabad, a village in Bostanabad County
 Ahmadabad, Hashtrud, a village in Hashtrud County
 Ahmadabad-e Leyqoli, a village in Heris County
 Ahmadabad-e Shahrak, a village in Heris County
 Ahmadabad, Jolfa, a village in Jolfa County
 Ahmadabad, Khoda Afarin, a village in Khoda Afarin County
 Ahmadabad, Malekan, a village in Malekan County
 Ahmadabad, Maragheh, a village in Maragheh County
 Ahmadabad-e Garus, a village in Meyaneh County
 Ahmadabad-e Khanliq, a village in Meyaneh County
 Ahmadabad-e Olya, East Azerbaijan, a village in Sarab County
 Ahmadabad-e Sofla, East Azerbaijan, a village in Sarab County

Fars Province
Ahmadabad, Arsanjan, a village in Arsanjan County
Ahmadabad, Eqlid, a village in Eqlid County
Ahmadabad Rural District (Eqlid County), in Eqlid County
Ahmadabad, Farashband, a village in Farashband County
Ahmadabad, Fasa, a village in Fasa County
Ahmadabad, Firuzabad, a village in Firuzabad County
Ahmadabad Rural District (Firuzabad County), in Firuzabad County
Ahmadabad, Kazerun, a village in Kazerun County
Ahmadabad, Balyan, a village in Kazerun County
Ahmadabad, Deris, a village in Kazerun County
Ahmadabad, Kharameh, a village in Kharameh County
Ahmadabad, Khorrambid, a village in Khorrambid County
Ahmadabad, Marvdasht, a village in Marvdasht County
Ahmadabad-e Kateh, a village in Marvdasht County
Ahmadabad, Pasargad, a village in Pasargad County
Ahmadabad, Sepidan, a village in Sepidan County
Ahmadabad, Shiraz, a village in Shiraz County

Gilan Province
Ahmadabad, Gilan, a village in Rudsar County

Golestan Province
Ahmadabad, Aliabad, a village in Aliabad County
Ahmadabad, Azadshahr, a village in Azadshahr County

Hamadan Province
Ahmadabad, Asadabad, a village in Asadabad County
Ahmadabad, Hamadan, a village in Hamadan County
Ahmadabad-e Tappeh, a village in Hamadan County
Ahmadabad, Kabudarahang, a village in Kabudarahang County
Ahmadabad, Malayer, a village in Malayer County
Ahmadabad-e Daryab, a village in Nahavand County
Ahmadabad-e Olya, Hamadan, a village in Nahavand County
Ahmadabad, Razan, a village in Razan County
Ahmadabad, Tuyserkan, a village in Tuyserkan County

Hormozgan Province
Ahmadabad, Hajjiabad, a village in Hajjiabad County
Ahmadabad, Khamir, a village in Khamir County
Ahmadabad, Minab, a village in Minab County
Ahmadabad-e Koleybi, a village in Minab County
Ahmadabad, Mosaferabad, a village in Rudan County
Ahmadabad, Rudkhaneh, a village in Rudan County

Ilam Province
Ahmadabad, Ilam, a village in Dehloran County

Isfahan Province
Ahmadabad, Ardestan, a village in Ardestan County
Ahmadabad, Buin va Miandasht, a village in Buin va Miandasht County
Ahmadabad, Isfahan, a village in Isfahan County
Ahmadabad, Kashan, a village in Kashan County
Ahmadabad, Mobarakeh, a village in Mobarakeh County
Ahmadabad, Tiran and Karvan, a village in Tiran and Karvan County

Kerman Province

Anar County
 Ahmadabad, Anar, a village in Anar County
 Ahmadabad-e Atayi, a village in Anar County

Anbarabad County
 Ahmadabad, Anbarabad, a village in Anbarabad County
 Ahmadabad-e Esfandiyari, a village in Anbarabad County

Baft County

Kahnuj County
 Ahmadabad, Kahnuj, a village in Kahnuj County

Kerman County
 Ahmadabad, Kerman, a village in Kerman County
 Ahmadabad-e Do, Kerman, a village in Kerman County
 Ahmadabad-e Do, Rayen, a village in Kerman County
 Ahmadabad-e Yek, Chatrud, a village in Kerman County

Qaleh Ganj County
 Ahmadabad, Qaleh Ganj, a village in Qaleh Ganj County

Rafsanjan County
 Ahmadabad, Eslamiyeh, a village in Rafsanjan County
 Ahmadabad, Ferdows, a village in Rafsanjan County
 Ahmadabad, Koshkuiyeh, a village in Rafsanjan County
 Ahmadabad, Nuq, a village in Rafsanjan County
 Ahmadabad, Sharifabad, a village in Rafsanjan County
 Ahmadabad-e Abbaskhan, a village in Rafsanjan County

Rigan County
 Ahmadabad, Rigan, a village in Rigan County

Shahr-e Babak County
 Ahmadabad, Shahr-e Babak, a village in Shahr-e Babak County

Sirjan County

Zarand County
 Ahmadabad, Zarand, a village in Zarand County

Kermanshah Province
 Ahmadabad, Kermanshah, a village in Kermanshah County
 Ahmadabad, Miyan Darband, a village in Kermanshah County
 Ahmadabad-e Olya, Kermanshah, a village in Kermanshah County
 Ahmadabad-e Sofla, Kermanshah, a village in Kermanshah County
 Ahmadabad, Sahneh, a village in Sahneh County
 Ahmadabad-e Molla Mas, a village in Sahneh County
 Ahmadabad, Sarpol-e Zahab, a village Sarpol-e Zahab County

Khuzestan Province

Ahvaz County
Ahmadabad, Ahvaz, a village in Ahvaz County
Ahmadabad-e Abdal, a village in Ahvaz County

Andika County
Ahmadabad, Andika, a village in Andika County
Ahmadabad, Abezhdan, a village in Andika County
Ahmadabad-e Dinarak, a village in Andika County
Ahmadabad-e Sar Tang, a village in Andika County

Dezful County
Ahmadabad, Dezful, a village in Dezful County

Hoveyzeh County
Ahmadabad, Hoveyzeh, a village in Hoveyzeh County

Izeh County

Lali County
Ahmadabad-e Barkeh, a village in Lali County

Masjed Soleyman County
Ahmadabad, Masjed Soleyman, a village in Masjed Soleyman County

Kurdistan Province
Ahmadabad, Bijar, a village in Bijar County
Ahmadabad, Divandarreh, a village in Divandarreh County
Ahmadabad, Kamyaran, a village in Kamyaran County
Ahmadabad, Marivan, a village in Marivan County
Ahmadabad, Qorveh, a village in Qorveh County
Ahmadabad, Serishabad, a village in Qorveh County
Ahmadabad Sara, a village in Saqqez County
Ahmadabad Sunaj, a village in Saqqez County
Ahmadabad, Sarvabad, a village in Sarvabad County

Lorestan Province
Ahmadabad, Dorud, a village in Dorud County
Ahmadabad, Khorramabad, a village in Khorramabad County
Ahmadabad, Pol-e Dokhtar, a village in Pol-e Dokhtar County
Ahmadabad, Selseleh, a village in Selseleh County
Ahmadabad, alternate name of Sarab Sorkheh Ahmadabad, a village in Selseleh County

Markazi Province
Ahmadabad, Arak, a village in Arak County
Ahmadabad, Khondab, a village in Khondab County
Ahmadabad, Saveh, a village in Saveh County
Ahmadabad-e Shadjerd, a village in Saveh County
Ahmadabad, Tafresh, a village in Tafresh County
Ahmadabad (35°24′ N 50°23′ E), Zarandieh, a village in Zarandieh County

Mazandaran Province
 Ahmadabad-e Kalij-e Olya, a village in Mahmudabad County
 Ahmadabad-e Kalij-e Sofla, a village in Mahmudabad County

North Khorasan Province
 Ahmadabad Mangeli, a village in Esfarayen County

Qazvin Province
Ahmadabad, Abgarm, a village in Abgarm District, Buin Zahra County, Qazvin Province, Iran
 Ahmadabad, Dashtabi, a village in Dashtabi District, Buin Zahra County, Qazvin Province, Iran
 Ahmadabad, Takestan, a village in Takestan County, Qazvin Province, Iran
 Ahmadabad-e Owfan, a village in Qazvin County, Qazvin Province, Iran

Qom Province
Ahmadabad, Qom, a village in Iran

Razavi Khorasan Province
Ahmadabad, Bajestan, a village in Bajestan County
Ahmadabad, Chenaran, a village in Chenaran County
Ahmadabad, Fariman, a village in Fariman County
Ahmadabad, Firuzeh, a village in Firuzeh County
Ahmadabad, Gonabad, a village in Gonabad County
Ahmadabad, Jowayin, a village in Jowayin County
Ahmadabad-e Malek, a village in Jowayin County
Ahmadabad, Kalat, a village in Kalat County
Ahmadabad, Khvaf, a village in Khvaf County
Ahmadabad, Darzab, a village in Mashhad County
Ahmadabad, Kenevist, a village in Mashhad County
Ahmadabad, Razaviyeh, a village in Mashhad County
Ahmadabad-e Moqbel, a village in Mashhad County
Ahmadabad, Nishapur, a village in Nishapur County
Ahmadabad, Miyan Jolgeh, a village in Nishapur County
Ahmadabad, Zeberkhan, a village in Nishapur County
Ahmadabad, Quchan, a village in Quchan County
Ahmadabad, Rashtkhvar, a village in Rashtkhvar County
Ahmadabad-e Khazai, a village in Torbat-e Heydarieh County
Ahmadabad-e Sheykh, a village in Torbat-e Heydarieh County
Ahmadabad-e Banakdar, a village in Torbat-e Jam County
Ahmadabad-e Sowlat, a village in Torbat-e Jam County

Semnan Province
Ahmadabad, Garmsar, a village in Garmsar County
Ahmadabad, Shahrud, a village in Shahrud County

Sistan and Baluchestan Province
Ahmadabad, Dalgan, a village in Dalgan County
Ahmadabad, alternate name of Chah-e Ali, Dalgan, a village in Dalgan County
Ahmadabad, Iranshahr, a village in Iranshahr County

South Khorasan Province
Ahmadabad, Darmian, a village in Darmian County
Ahmadabad, Nehbandan, a village in Nehbandan County
Ahmadabad, Dastgerdan, a village in Tabas County
Ahmadabad, Deyhuk, a village in Tabas County
Ahmadabad-e Kalateh, a village in Tabas County

Tehran Province
Ahmadabad, Tehran, a village in Varamin County, Tehran Province, Iran
Ahmadabad-e Mostowfi, a village in Eslamshahr County, Tehran Province, Iran
Ahmadabad-e Mostowfi Rural District, an administrative subdivision of Eslamshahr County, Tehran Province, Iran
Ahmadabad-e Vasat, a village in Varamin County, Tehran Province, Iran
 Imam Khomeini International Airport, originally designated Ahmadabad, an airport in Tehran, Iran

West Azerbaijan Province
 Ahmadabad, Bukan, a village in Bukan County
 Ahmadabad, Dizaj, a village in Khoy County
 Ahmadabad, Firuraq, a village in Khoy County
 Ahmadabad, Miandoab, a village in Miandoab County
 Ahmadabad, Shahin Dezh, a village in Shahin Dezh County
 Ahmadabad-e Dash Kasan, a village in Shahin Dezh County
 Ahmadabad, Showt, a village in Showt County
 Ahmadabad-e Olya, West Azerbaijan, a village in Takab County
 Ahmadabad-e Sofla, West Azerbaijan, a village in Takab County
 Ahmadabad Rural District (Takab County)

Yazd Province
Ahmadabad, Yazd, a city in Iran
Ahmadabad, Abarkuh, a village in Abarkuh County
Ahmadabad, Behabad, a village in Behabad County
Ahmadabad, Khatam, a village in Khatam County
Ahmadabad, Mehriz, a village in Mehriz County
Ahmadabad, Nir, a village in Taft County
Ahmadabad-e Mashir, a village in Yazd County

Zanjan Province
Ahmadabad, Qareh Poshtelu, a village in Zanjan County